Mihkel Neps (19 September 1890 Lümanda Parish (now Saaremaa Parish), Kreis Ösel – 21 March 1937 Kuressaare, Saare County) was an Estonian politician. He was a member of Estonian Constituent Assembly.

References

1890 births
1937 deaths
People from Saaremaa Parish
People from Kreis Ösel
Estonian Social Democratic Workers' Party politicians
Estonian Socialist Workers' Party politicians
Members of the Estonian Constituent Assembly
Members of the Riigikogu, 1920–1923
Members of the Riigikogu, 1923–1926